Texel is a municipality and an island with a population of 13,643 in North Holland, Netherlands. It is the largest and most populated island of the West Frisian Islands in the Wadden Sea. The island is situated north of Den Helder, northeast of Noorderhaaks, and southwest of Vlieland.

Name 
The name Texel is Frisian, but because of historical sound-changes in Dutch, where all -x- sounds have been replaced with -s- sounds (compare for instance English fox, Frisian fokse, German Fuchs with Dutch vos), the name is typically pronounced Tessel in Dutch.

History
The All Saints' Flood (1170) created the islands of Texel and Wieringen from North Holland. In the 13th century Ada, Countess of Holland was held prisoner on Texel by her uncle, William I, Count of Holland.

Texel received city rights in 1415.

The first Dutch expedition to the Northwest Passage departed from the island on the 5th of June, 1594. 

Texel was involved in the Battle of Scheveningen (1653) during the First Anglo-Dutch War and the Battle of Texel (1673) during the Third Anglo-Dutch War.

During the American Revolution, Texel was used as a haven port by John Paul Jones after the Battle of Flamborough Head off the Yorkshire coast in September 1779. In that action, Jones defeated and captured the British ship , which he sailed to Texel for desperately needed repairs. This event further complicated Anglo-Dutch relations.

In 1797, Texel was involved in the Battle of Camperdown during the French Revolutionary Wars.

During the First World War in 1914, the Battle off Texel took place off the coast of Texel.

On the night of 31 August 1940, the sea to the northwest of Texel was the scene of the sinking of two British destroyers and the severe damage of a third by German mines in what is known as the Texel Disaster.

At the end of the Second World War in 1945, the Georgian uprising on Texel took place on the island.  Following a German decision to redeploy Georgian soldiers to the mainland, they revolted and killed hundreds of their German comrades while they slept.  The uprising lasted from 5 April 1945 until 20 May 1945, two weeks after V-E Day. At that point, Canadian troops arrived and arranged for the two sides to separately leave the island. For that reason, the uprising is often referred to as the final battle of the Second World War in Europe.  Hundreds of Georgians who died fighting against the Germans are buried in a special cemetery on Texel commonly known as the "Russian cemetery".

Geography 

The island of Texel is situated north of the city of Den Helder, northeast of the uninhabited island of Noorderhaaks, which is part of the municipality, and southwest of the island of Vlieland.

The island includes the seven villages:
 and the small townships of 

The island of Texel was originally made up of two islands, Texel proper to the south and Eierland to the northeast, which were connected by shoals. In the early seventeenth century, the islands were connected by a dyke to keep the North Sea from ravaging the coastal areas of Texel proper. In the mid-nineteenth century a polder completed the northern half of the island. Today, Texel forms the largest natural barrier between the North Sea and the Wadden Sea.

The dune landscape along the western coast of the island is protected as Dunes of Texel National Park.

Landscape 
The island is 23.7 km long and 9.6 km wide, its surface is 169.82 square kilometres. The highest point of the island is not, as one might assume, de Hoge Berg (15 m above sea level), but the dune "Bertusnol" (also "Nol van Bertus"), which is situated in the Dunes of Texel National Park, at 19.6 m.
The dune landscape on Texel is a unique habitat for wildlife. Notable areas include De Slufter, where the tide comes in and meets the dunes, forming a marshy environment rich in both fauna and flora. Texel is known for its wildlife, particularly in winter, when birds of prey and geese take up residence. About one third of Texel is a protected nature reserve. A wetland called Utopia has been designed for birds to nest in.

Gallery

Climate
Texel has an oceanic climate (Köppen Cfb) that is heavily influenced by its offshore position. While winters are similar to mainland areas, summers remain cooler. The relative proximity to the mainland still renders heat bursts to reach Texel with five months having recorded temperatures above . While the island is relatively rainy, the precipitation is generally quite even and moderate throughout most of the year although there is a dry peak in late spring and a rain peak in autumn.

Notable people 

 Willem Eduard Bok (1846 in Den Burg – 1904), a Dutch-born South African Boer politician, civil servant and statesman 
 Rene Daalder (1944–2019), a Dutch writer and director
 Cornelis de Jager (1921 in Den Burg - 2021), a Dutch astronomer who predicts solar variation
 Imme Dros (born 1936 in Oudeschild), a Dutch writer of children's literature
 Hans Kamp (born 1940 in Den Burg), a Dutch philosopher and linguist, introduced Discourse Representation Theory
 Willem Hendrik Keesom (1876 in Texel – 1956), a Dutch physicist who first froze liquid helium
 Sim Visser (1908 in Eierland – 1983), a Dutch politician
 Henk Zijm (born 1952 in Driehuizen), a Dutch mathematician from the University of Twente

Sport 
 Denise Betsema (born 1993 in Oudeschild), a cyclo-cross cyclist
 Alice Blom (born 1980 in Oudeschild), a volleyball player
 Dorian van Rijsselberghe (born 1988 in Den Burg), a sailor, gold medallist at the 2012 and 2016 Summer Olympics

Economy 
The tourism industry forms a substantial part of the economy in Texel. Approximately 70% of activities on Texel are in some way related to tourism. Popular forms of tourism on Texel include cycling, walking, swimming and horse riding. Farming (sheep, potatoes, dairy, tulips, and grain) and fishing (primarily from Oudeschild) are traditional. Locally brewed beer is sold under the tradename Texels.

Local government 
The municipal council of Texel consists of 15 seats, which are divided as follows (from the most recent election results in 2022:

Transport 

Transport around the island is typically by bicycle, bus (Texelhopper) or car. Texel has an extensive cycle path network. Transport to Texel is easiest by a very short ferry trip Royal TESO), from Den Helder, or by air via Texel International Airport. The ferry Texelstroom uses 80% compressed natural gas.

See also
Grand Hotel Opduin
Texel sheep

References

External links

 
 

 
Islands of North Holland
Municipalities of North Holland
West Frisian Islands